Hubworld was an American news magazine television series on The Hub. It was produced by Natural 9 Entertainment with an association with Hasbro Studios. The program premiered on November 5, 2010 and was hosted by actor/magician Justin "Kredible" Willman. The program's premiere date was delayed from The Hub's launch date on October 10, 2010, to November due to unknown factors.

Program summary

Hubworld provided looks at current programs then on The Hub, including shows such as Family Game Night, the network's animated franchises such as  G.I. Joe: Renegades, Transformers: Prime, Dan Vs. and My Little Pony: Friendship Is Magic. Segments included Willman's comedic news and current events monologue called "Back it Up", and "Hub Happenings", which involved Willman riffing on short clips of Hub programming.

Other segments included interviews of current pop music stars, celebrities and sports stars, press line interviews at film premieres or junket interviews of film stars, and features involving children doing good in their communities and throughout the world. An ending segment features musician Danny Tieger singing a song about the news events of the week in a segment called "Just to Let You Know News Jam".

References

External links

2010 American television series debuts
2011 American television series endings
2010s American television news shows
2010s American variety television series
Infotainment
Television series by Hasbro Studios
American television series with live action and animation
Discovery Family original programming
English-language television shows